

.kw is the Internet country code top-level domain (ccTLD) for Kuwait.  Domain registrations are at the third level beneath these names:

 com.kw: Commercial entities with a valid commercial license from the Ministry of Commerce and Industry.
 ind.kw: An individual who is not a minor and holds Kuwaiti nationality or a resident who holds a valid residence in the State of Kuwait.
 net.kw: ICT licensed company from the respective authorities in the State of Kuwait.
 org.kw: A non-profit entity licensed by the concerned authorities in the State of Kuwait to operate.
 gov.kw: Ministries & Government entities.
 emb.kw: Embassies of other countries in Kuwait.
 edu.kw: An educational entity licensed by the concerned authorities in the State of Kuwait to operate.
 .kw: special requests from government entities; to be open for public use in near future.

Registration is done through accredited registrars by providing the right documents and a fee of 15 KD per year, with the license period running either one or two years (currently there is an intention to allow any period between 1 and 10 years in near future).

External links
 Communications and Information Technology Regulatory Authority 
 Registry site
 Accredited Registrars
 IANA .kw whois information

Country code top-level domains
Telecommunications in Kuwait